Raúl Miguel Silva Fonseca Castanheira de Oliveira (born 26 August 1972) is a Portuguese retired footballer who played as a central defender.

Club career
Born in Lisbon, Oliveira played for six clubs in his native country: Amora FC, C.F. Os Belenenses, S.C. Farense, C.F. Estrela da Amadora – his biggest success, spending four consecutive seasons in the Primeira Liga, almost always as a starter– Académica de Coimbra and S.C. Lusitânia, retiring in 2008 at the age of 35.

Oliveira started an abroad stint in England with Bradford City in early 1997, appearing in only two Division One games during the campaign for Chris Kamara's team and subsequently resuming his career in Portugal.

References

External links

1972 births
Living people
Portuguese footballers
Footballers from Lisbon
Association football defenders
Primeira Liga players
Liga Portugal 2 players
Segunda Divisão players
Amora F.C. players
C.F. Os Belenenses players
S.C. Farense players
C.F. Estrela da Amadora players
Associação Académica de Coimbra – O.A.F. players
S.C. Lusitânia players
English Football League players
Bradford City A.F.C. players
Portuguese expatriate footballers
Expatriate footballers in England
Portuguese expatriate sportspeople in England